Basic Love ( is a 2009 Hong Kong romantic drama film directed by Oxide Pang.

Plot
A romantic story symphonised with the song of a triangular relationship between Ling (Elanne Kong), June (Janice Man) and Rex (Rex Ho). Ling got leukaemia since she was a child; she hides the true feeling and health condition from her best friends, Rex and June. June who moved from China to HK when she was little, assists her mother to make a living hardily resulting in a self-contained character. The two girls are completely different in personality, yet they're frank with each other. June feels for Rex. Meanwhile, June seems to overlook an admirer, Hee (Xu Zheng Xi). It's graduation time, they're standing in front of the crossroad to their future, and none of them takes a step closer to change their relationship, until the day when Ling is admitted to the hospital, the long compression of emotion is broken.

Cast
 Elanne Kong as Ling
 Rex Ho as Rex
 Janice Man as June
 Xu Zheng Xi as Jin Hee
 James Ho as James
 Brian Li as Brian
 Yumi Yin as Yumi
 Cheng Pei-pei as Ling's grandmother
 Sek Lan as Ling's mother
 Gary Chiu as Gary
 Pakho Chau
 Nelson Cheung as June's boss

See also
 Hong Kong films of 2009

External links

Basic Love at the Hong Kong Movie Database

2009 films
2000s Cantonese-language films
2009 romantic drama films
Hong Kong romantic drama films
2000s Hong Kong films